Anicla illapsa (snowy dart) is a moth of the family Noctuidae. It is found from New Brunswick to Florida, west to Texas, Nebraska and Ontario.

The wingspan is 29–35 mm. Adults are on wing from May to October. There are two generations per year.

Larvae have been reared on Phleum pratense and probably feed on various other grasses in the wild.

External links
Images
Bug Guide
The Noctuinae (Lepidoptera: Noctuidae) of Great Smoky Mountains National Park, U.S.A.

Noctuinae
Moths of North America
Moths described in 1857